Oriente (Portuguese for "east") is a municipality in the state of São Paulo in Brazil. The population is 6,542 (2020 est.) in an area of 219 km². The elevation is 604 m.

Notable people
Marcos Roberto Silveira Reis, football player

References

Municipalities in São Paulo (state)